The 1986 French Grand Prix was a Formula One motor race held at Paul Ricard on 6 July 1986. It was the eighth race of the 1986 Formula One World Championship.

Following Elio de Angelis's fatal testing crash on the full  circuit two months previously, a decision was made to use the shorter,  "Club" circuit for this race and for future F1 races (up to and including 1990).

The 80-lap race was won by Nigel Mansell, driving a Williams-Honda. It was Mansell's third victory of the season. Alain Prost finished second in a McLaren-TAG, with Nelson Piquet third in the other Williams-Honda. Ayrton Senna took pole position in his Lotus-Renault, but crashed at Signes early in the race after sliding on oil laid by Andrea de Cesaris's failed Minardi.

This race marked Scuderia Ferrari's 400th start in a World Championship event as a team.

Classification

Qualifying

Race

Championship standings after the race

Drivers' Championship standings

Constructors' Championship standings

References

French Grand Prix
French Grand Prix
Grand Prix
French Grand Prix